The Evergreen Congregational Church and School is a historic church and school at 497 Meridian Road in Beachton, Georgia.  It is notable for its architecture, for its association with social history of the area, and for its association with civil rights leader Andrew Young, who served as its pastor from 1957 to 1959.  It was added to the National Register of Historic Places in 2002.

The Evergreen Congregational Church was founded in 1903.

The present church on the property was built in 1928.  The school was built in 1911 and was the first school for black children in the area.

James E. Wright (1887-1972), who had an architecture degree from Tuskegee University, designed the school.

The Evergreen church is a gable-front church with an entrance porch and cupola (photo 3).
Constructed in 1928, the church is built of concrete block and wood lath with a stucco finish. The
gable-roofed portico is supported by four posts. Two posts rest on the concrete steps, the outer
posts are set directly in the ground. The front gables of the both the portico and the roof are clad in
beveled weatherboard. The roof is covered with sheet metal and surmounted by a pyramidal-roofed
cupola. Four pilasters are located between the sash windows on each side of the church. Between
1989 and 1991, the congregation built a 30-foot long annex to the rear of the church (photos 4-5).
The annex is constructed of concrete block with steel lath and stuccoed to match the original church.
Entrances are located on each side of the annex.
The sanctuary, which represents most of the ch

The school, built in 1911, is a one- and one-half-story cruciform-plan building with classrooms on the
first floor and quarters for teachers above (photos 8-9). The school was designed by James E.
Wright, a member of the Evergreen congregation. The school was constructed with poured-concrete
reinforced with steel wire. The wood forms, sometimes even the wood grain, are visible in the
horizontal bands across the exterior of the school. The window sills and lintels are also poured
concrete. The exterior is distinguished by an enclosed entrance porch topped by a gable-roofed
balcony. The steeply pitched side-gable roof features exposed rafter ends, interior end chimneys,
and dormers across the front and rear (photos 5 and 11). The roof is covered with metal shingles
and the gable ends are clad in weatherboard. The cornerstone is located on the northwest corner
and reads: Grady County/Training School/A.M.A 1911 (photo 10).
The interior of the school remains largely unchanged since it was buil

The Evergreen church is typical of African-American churches with the simple massing of its gableroofed
rectangular-shaped sanctuary and in its use of inexpensive materials, such as concrete block
and stucco. The school was designed by James E. Wright, a member of the Evergreen
congregation. It is a rare and especially important resource because its craftsmanship is evident in
the rough finish on the poured-concrete walls, which indicates the work of congregation members
and not skilled laborers. The interior with its classroom, blackboards, folding doors, kitchen, and
upstairs teachers quarters conveys the building's function as a school.
The Evergreen Congregational Church and School is significant at the state level because of its
association with Andrew Young, a leader of the American Civil Rights Movement, Ambassador to the
United Nations, and two-term mayor of Atlanta. Born on March 12, 1932 in New Orleans, Young
earned a bachelor of arts degree from Howard University in 1951. He later earned a bachelor of
divinity degree from Hartford Theological Seminary as a minister in the United Church of Christ.
Young first served as pastor at Evergreen Congregational Church in Beachton from 1957 to 1959. In
his autobiography, An Easy Burden (1996), Young noted that the lessons he learned at Evergreen
served him during the struggle for civil rights. During his pastorate at Evergreen, Young first became
involved in the civil right movement. During the 1960s, he joined the Southern Christian Leadership
Conference (SCLC), and served as an administrative assistant and later as Executive Director under
Dr. Martin Luther King, Jr. In 1972, he was elected to Congress. In 1976, President Jimmy Carter
appointed him United States Ambassador to the United Nations. Young served as mayor of Atlanta
from 1981 to 1989. He was co-chairman of the Atlanta Committee for the Olympic Games and
currently serves as President of the National Council of Churches.

In 1903, a group Beachton residents organized the Evergreen Congregational Church. That same
year, Jerry Walden, Jr., led a group of community men in erecting a one-room frame school building
on a one-acre site that was donated by Please Hawthorne. This was the first school for black
children in the area. In 1904, a frame church was built adjacent to the school. The programs and
activities of the church and school were intermingled under the supervision of the pastors. Reverend
William H. Holloway served as the first pastor from 1904 until 1910. He was followed by Reverend
Henry S. Barnwell, who served until 1916. In 1924, after an eight-year vacancy, Reverend George
W. Hannar served as pastor and as principal of the school. Reverend Hannar resigned in 1930 and
was replaced that same year by Reverend W. J. Hill. Andrew Young served as pastor from 1957 to
1959. In 1974, Reverend Artis Johnson arrived and remains the current pastor.
From the beginning, the American Missionary Association assumed responsibility for the church and
school because of negligence by the public schools in the education of African-American children. In
1910, an adjacent acre of land was acquired and a new school building was constructed the next
year. The new school building featured classrooms on the first floor and living quarters on the floor
above. In 1916, the school was renamed Grady County Training School when the county assumed
partial responsibility for the school.
In 1925, the original frame church was demolished. The new concrete-block church was completed
in 1928. In 1942, electric lights were installed and indoor bathrooms were b

In 1938, the educational programs at Evergreen were moved by the county to another location. The
Evergreen school was then used as a community hall for such activities as voter registration drives,
meetings with county commissioners, farm agents, home demonstration agents, 4-H Boys and Girls
Clubs, and Boy Scouts. The school is currently known as Evergreen Recreation Center and serves
as the fellowship hall for Evergreen church.
A number of church members played important roles in the history and development of Evergreen
Congregational Church. Jerry Walden, Jr., was born in Grady County in 1869. He went to the public
school in Thomas County and later attended Morehouse College in Atlanta. In 1903, Walden led a
group of community men in erecting a one-room wood school building on a one-acre site that was
donated by Please Hawthorne. This was the first school for black children in the area. Walden was
the first African-American teacher in Beachton. He taught in Beachton until his death in 1935.
Please Hawthorne was born in 1854 in rural Grady County. He spent much of his life operating a
general merchandise store in the Beachton area until his death in 1927. In 1903, he donated a oneacre
site on which Jerry Walden, Jr., built the Evergreen school.

References

Congregational churches in Georgia (U.S. state)
Churches on the National Register of Historic Places in Georgia (U.S. state)
Churches completed in 1911
Buildings and structures in Grady County, Georgia
National Register of Historic Places in Grady County, Georgia